Cohoon is a surname. Notable people with the surname include:

Dennis Cohoon (born 1953), American politician
Hannah Cohoon (1788–1864), American painter
Joanne M. Cohoon ( 1954–2016), American sociologist
Willis E. Cohoon (1902–1960), American attorney and politician